Trophy Jules Pappaert or Pappaert cup is a Belgian football trophy since 1953 and is awarded annually to a club in the first, second or third division of the Belgian Pro League with the longest uninterrupted series of unbeaten games.

The award is given by  La Dernière Heure / Les Sports  and is named after the former footballer Jules Pappaert. During the 1930s, he was Royale Union Saint-Gilloise's captain. In that period, Union was able to achieve a series of 60 unbeaten games. To date, this record still stands.

Honors

Belgian football trophies and awards
Belgian Pro League
Awards established in 1953
1953 establishments in Belgium
Annual events in Belgium